Beth Hamedrash Hagodol (Hebrew  for "Great House of Learning") may refer to the following:
 Beth Hamedrash Hagodol (Manhattan, New York)
 Beth Hamedrash Hagodol Synagogue (Hartford, Connecticut)
 Beth HaMedrosh Hagodol-Beth Joseph (Denver, Colorado)
 Beth Hamedrosh Hagodol Cemetery (Bellevue, Nebraska)
 Beth Hamedrash Hagadol (Newark, New Jersey)

See also 
 Beth midrash
 Beth Medrash Govoha
 Beth Medrash Elyon